Two killings have occurred in Isla Vista, California:
 2001 Isla Vista killings, a vehicular assault that killed 4 people and injured one other person on February 23
 2014 Isla Vista killings, a killing spree consisting of stabbing, mass shooting and vehice ramming that left 6 people dead and injured 14 others on May 23